Pancha Bhoothalu is a 1979 Indian Telugu-language film directed by P.C.Reddy, starring Chandramohan.

Plot

Pancha Bhoothalu is a family film.

Cast

Chandramohan
Lata (Heroine)

Soundtrack 

 Kalla lo evo evo kala le kadalade evela.(Lyricist-Dr.C.Narayana Reddy, Singers S.P.Balu and P. Susheela)

References

External links
 

1979 films
1980s Telugu-language films
Films scored by Ilaiyaraaja